The , also known as the "Yumekamome", is one of two lines of the Kobe Municipal Subway. Trains of the line are propelled by linear motors. This is the third linear motor rapid transit line to be built in Japan.

History 
Construction of the line began in 1994 but was interrupted by the Great Hanshin earthquake which hit Kobe in 1995. Despite the cross section of the tunnels being smaller compared to a conventional subway tunnel, there was still a substantial amount of construction happening at surface level. 

After being scheduled for a 1999 opening, revenue service began in 2001. 

Since opening, ridership numbers have stagnated. The projected ridership within 2001 was estimated to be 80,000 boardings, the actual boardings recorded were just over 34,000 in that year. The goal of 50,000 boardings by 2020 was also not achieved.

Operation 

The maximum grade on the line is 50%.

Stations

Rolling stock 
 5000 series (since 2001)

All trains are based at Misaki-Kōen Depot.

References

External links 

 Official website (in Japanese)
 Official route map (in English and Japanese)

Kobe Municipal Subway
Transport in Kobe
Linear motor metros
Railway lines opened in 2001